Labaran Maku (born 1 January 1962) is a Nigerian politician and former Minister of Information of Nigeria.

Early life 
Maku was born on 1 January 1962 at Wakama District in Nassarawa Eggon Local Govt Area of Nassarawa State.

Education 
He attended St Michael's Primary School, Aloce between 1970 and 1976, Zawan Teacher's College, Bukuru-Jos, Plateau State, 1976–1981 and the University of Jos Plateau State 1983–1987.  
Maku took to politics and leadership early in life and held the position of President of University of Jos Students Union and PRO of the National Umbrella of the National Association of Nigerian Students (NANS), while in school.

He holds a bachelor's degree in History/Education and has attended numerous training programmes, International Conferences, Presidential Retreats and Seminars. He has presented Papers at International Conferences, was Guest Speaker at several Leadership Fora and has written extensively on Nigerian education and social inequality and on Nigerian political and economic problems.
He   worked with USAID from 1997 – 1999. He was a Reporter, a Political Editor, member of Editorial Board of two National Newspapers and Deputy Editor-in-Chief during his career as Journalist. He also worked as a school Teacher and Headmaster at government owned schools from 1981 – 1983.

Political Career 
He was the Deputy Governor of Nasarawa State from 2003 to 2007, where he assumed leadership responsibilities of governing State Agencies and Institutions. Prior to that, he was the Commissioner for Information Youth and Sports 1999–2002, and Commissioner for Information and Internal Affairs 2002–2003. He was the spokesperson of the State and a key actor in the formulation of State policies.
 
He became the Minister of State for Information and Communications in June 2010 and subsequently assumed the position of substantive Minister of Information and Communications in December 2010. He resigned 20th of October, 2018 to pursue his ambition in 2015 Nasarawa State gubernatorial election.

References

Living people
Government ministers of Nigeria
People from Nasarawa State
1962 births
University of Jos alumni